The 1886 Rutgers Queensmen football team was an American football team that represented Rutgers University as an independent during the 1886 college football season. The team compiled a 1–3 record and was outscored by a total of 115 to 70. The team had no coach, and its captain was Asa Wynkoop.

Schedule

References

Rutgers
Rutgers Scarlet Knights football seasons
Rutgers Queensmen football